Jerry Mahoney may refer to:

Jerry Mahoney (umpire) (1860–1947), Major League Baseball umpire
Jerry Mahony (born 1956), racing driver
Jerry O Mahoney, Irish Gaelic footballer
The namesake of the Bruce-Mahoney Trophy
A dummy used by ventriloquist Paul Winchell